Volleyball in the United States is popular with both male and female participants of all ages. Almost all high schools and colleges in the United States have female volleyball teams, and most regions of the country have developmental programs for girls of all ages as well. While many areas of the country are forming male teams and development programs, there are still fewer opportunities for young male athletes to play volleyball in the United States than for young female athletes. Men's volleyball is a fast-growing sport among high schools, with 36 states having male volleyball programs. Most men's seasons are in the spring while women's seasons take place primarily in the fall; however, there are a few men's teams such as in Wisconsin, Virginia, and New York who play in the fall as well.

National teams
The United States men's national volleyball team has won three gold medals at the 1984, 1988, and 2008 Olympic Games, the 1986 FIVB World Championship, the 1985 and 2015 FIVB Volleyball Men's World Cup, and the 2014 FIVB World League.

Meanwhile, the United States women's national volleyball team has won the 2020 Tokyo Olympics, the 2014 FIVB World Championship, six editions of the FIVB World Grand Prix, and the 2018, 2019 and 2021 FIVB Nations League. Also, they finished second at the 1984, 2008 and 2012 Olympic Games, the 1967 and 2002 FIVB World Championship, the 2005 and 2013 FIVB World Grand Champions, and the 2011 and 2019 FIVB World Cup

Professional volleyball
As a professional sport, volleyball has had limited success in the United States. International Volleyball Association was a co-ed professional league that existed from 1975 to 1980. Numerous attempts have been made to start professional indoor women's volleyball leagues. Major League Volleyball was a women's league with six teams that played for two-and-a-half seasons from 1987 to 1989 with games shown on ESPN on tape delay; it folded mid-season in 1989, however, due to financial losses. USA Volleyball Cup is an annual indoor volleyball championship. Two-man and two-woman professional beach volleyball leagues have done better, most notably the Association of Volleyball Professionals (AVP), but none have gained a wide following that would get them consistent coverage by the major television networks.  In 2002, United States Professional Volleyball League was begun as a women's professional indoor league, but only lasted one season. In 2004 and again in 2005, NBC aired the Nissan Championship series, with Fox Sports carrying the majority of the season.

There has been a large push within the volleyball community to provide professional outlets for developing athletes. As of 2019 there are currently two leagues aspiring to become professional that branch across the United States. First of these is the National Volleyball Association (NVA) founded in 2017. The NVA currently has 12 teams. The second league is the Volleyball League Of America (VLA) and has 5 teams spread across the United States.

Athletes Unlimited Volleyball (AUV) is a women's professional indoor volleyball league in the US, founded in 2021.

Liga de Voleibol Superior Masculino and Liga de Voleibol Superior Femenino are professional volleyball leagues in Puerto Rico.

NVA Teams:

VLA Current Teams:

Premier Volleyball League
A new indoor professional league, the Premier Volleyball League (sanctioned by USA Volleyball), began in 2012 with a women's division. In 2013 the PVL incorporated and launched a men's division. The PVL was discontinued in 2017.

College volleyball

Volleyball is a popular NCAA sport, mostly for women. In the 2013-14 school year, 1064 NCAA member schools, 329 of them in the top-level Division I, sponsored women's volleyball at the varsity level, with 16,647 participants across all three divisions. At the same time, 109 schools in all three NCAA divisions combined sponsored varsity men's volleyball, with only 23 of them in Division I; the number of men's varsity volleyball players was roughly one-tenth of women's participation (1,720 to 16,647).

In 2012, NCAA sanctioned college beach volleyball teams for women for the first time; 14 schools sponsored the sport, with slightly more than 200 participants. Also in 2012, the NCAA established its first-ever men's Division III championship. The NCAA held its first beach volleyball championship in 2016, by which time nearly 50 schools were sponsoring the sport.

High school volleyball

High school volleyball is a fall sport for girls and spring sport for boys (except in a few states).  Schools typically have a varsity and junior varsity team, and some schools also have freshman teams. Teams play in pre-season and season competition, generally followed by a post-season that includes a regional or sectional championship and often a state championship.

While each state governs its own high school volleyball competitions through their state athletic associations, most follow the lead of the National Federation of State High School Associations (NFHS) for the governance of the sport.  Most volleyball rules from state to state are basically the same in the United States.  However, because of the individual associations, some minor changes and variations may occur.  For example, the Ohio High School Athletic Association (OHSAA) may allow competition to be the best of five while the Kentucky High School Athletic Association (KHSAA) or the West Virginia Secondary School Activities Commission (WVSSAC) may only allow competition to be the best of three.   Today, however, most state associations are now using the same guidelines and are also using rally scoring, the best-of-five competition format, and allowing the libero to serve.  In addition, most states, if not all, have adopted the plain, white polo shirt for officials as opposed to the black and white striped shirt worn in the past.

Junior volleyball
Junior volleyball is played in the U.S. in many organizations such as churches, the YMCA and the Amateur Athletic Union (AAU), but the  largest sponsoring organization is USA Volleyball, which oversees what is commonly referred to as "club volleyball" and hosts a Junior Olympic Championship each year.

In club volleyball, junior players develop their skills and knowledge of the game, usually with the purpose of playing for high school teams. Elite players also prepare for college volleyball. The club season typically lasts from the end of November until July, with the annual Junior Olympic Championships (JOs) taking place in late June, early July.  Teams typically play tournaments throughout the season, establishing their ranking in the various regions and preparing for JOs or a season-ending tournament such as the Volleyball Festival, which claims to be the largest annual sporting event in the world.

To qualify for JOs, teams must compete in JO Qualifiers, also referred to as National Qualifiers.  There are nine qualifying tournaments across the country, to which teams travel to gain an invitation to JOs.  Top teams attend these tournaments to earn their bids, and college coaches will attend to view the year's crop of players.

The club season, long considered a supplemental place for girls and boys to gain experience in preparation for their upcoming high-school seasons, is now an almost necessity to stay competitive in the local high schools.    It is also extremely important in the college recruitment process, as most college seasons coincide with state high school seasons, causing the college coaches to miss the entire season.  This time is made up during the club season when college coaches are able to travel to various tournaments and meet with club coaches, watch club players, and recruit for their teams.

Today
Volleyball is one of the most popular girls' sports, and strong high school and club programs are found throughout the country. According to a 2017 survey by the National Federation of State High School Associations, volleyball is the second highest sport for female participation at the high school level behind outdoor track and field. One of the biggest events in high school-age sports is the annual Volleyball Festival in Phoenix, Arizona, (formerly in Reno, Nevada until 2009 and Sacramento, California until 2004), which draws as many as 10,000 players and three thousand coaches for its five-day tournament.

Boys' volleyball is popular on a regional basis, and by far the greatest number of boys' teams are in Southern California. However, on the national stage, boys' volleyball remains far less popular than the girls' game at the high school level, as borne out by the following statistics from the aforementioned NFHS survey:
 For every boy currently competing in high school volleyball, more than eight girls are involved.
 While all states as well as the District of Columbia sanction girls' volleyball, a substantial majority of states do not sanction the boys' game. Only 23 states reported any participation in boys' volleyball, indicating that the sport is not sanctioned in other jurisdictions. Thirteen states reported participation of over 10,000 girls in high school volleyball, and a fourteenth (Indiana) fell less than 20 participants short of that mark. Of these states, six have no boys' high school volleyball—Texas (#1 in girls' participation), Michigan (#4), Minnesota (#8), Iowa (#10), Washington (#12), and Indiana (#14).
 Even those states that do sanction volleyball for both sexes typically have considerably fewer schools sponsoring the boys' game and thus fewer participants. Of the remaining eight high-participation girls' volleyball states, none had even half as many boys competing as girls. Even California, with more than 40,000 girls' players, had fewer than 16,000 boys' players (which still constituted nearly a third of all boys' players in the country).

In the four years from 2004 to 2008, high school participation in boys' volleyball rose by more than 15%, from about 42,000 to nearly 50,000. However, since 2008, there has been essentially no growth in boys' volleyball participation.

References

External links

National Governing Body
 USA Volleyball
Collegiate
  NCAA Volleyball
 List of NCAA Women's Division I Schools
 List of NCAA Men's Schools
Beach
  The National Volleyball League (NVL)
  Association of Volleyball Professionals (AVP)
High School
  National Federation of State High School Associations (NFHS)
Juniors
  Amateur Athletic Union (AAU)
 USA Volleyball's Regions
 Junior Volleyball Directors Association (JVDA)
Professional
 Premier Volleyball League (PVL)
Other
  American Volleyball Coaches Association
  VolleyCentral - Volleyball news in the U.S.
 Volleyball Magazine